Alexander Gennadiyevich Yagubkin (25 April 1961 – 7 August 2013) was a Ukrainian amateur boxer who competed between 1979 and 1988. The only Soviet boxer to become the World heavyweight champion (1982,) never turned professional for political restrictions imposed by the Soviet government. He was ranked the world's #2 amateur heavyweight by the AIBA in 1984, and #1 in 1986.

Early years
Yagubkin was born and grew up in a Petrovka locality of Donetsk (the city had 11,000 registered boxers by 1984.) He took up boxing in 1974 at the age of thirteen with the Avangard Sports Society, he won three consecutive Soviet Youth Championships continuously in 1978, 1979 and 1980. In December 1980 in Tomsk he won the Soviet Championship in 91 kg. He has excelled, and Soviet coach Artyom Lavrov said this is a boxer worthy of his success. "In Russian, "amateur" and "like" are expressed by the same word lyubitel. He is a real amateur. He likes what he is doing." "I hope to follow the tradition of the Russian heavyweights," Yagubkin said.

Apart from boxing he was schooling as an aircraft technician, and later graduated from the Slavyansk Civil Aviation Vocational School. Later he graduated from the Kiev Athletics Institute.

Career
Steve Sneddon of the Reno Gazette-Journal, described Yagubkin as "a classic boxer with an educated left jab." As Yagubkin described his style in his own words, "I prefer the technical boxing, rather than the bump boxing." His style has been built around an effective jab. Untypically for a southpaw outboxer, he never got himself prepared for any particular style of his next opponent (while the U.S. team carefully studied available filmings of the ring performance of their Soviet opponents). "I'm never bothered not knowing an opponent. It's better not knowing him before going into the ring. If you prepare for one thing, it's difficult to change in the ring. A few seconds is enough to see what someone is doing." At the age of 23, he has won 155 of his 168 bouts. After he defeated Canadian Willie DeWitt, Novosti Press Agency praised him, "Yagubkin is known for his staunchness, courage, cold-bloodedness, flexible tactics and desire for victory." Always go with cold-bloodedness. Besides, Yagubkin won on points over deWitt, 21, in the World Cup at Montreal in 1981. DeWitt has a puncher's chance but Yagubkin rates a solid edge in international experience." "He's got a very strong punch. I want to avoid getting hit," said Yagubkin of DeWitt. After DeWitt won a controversial decision year-and-a-half later, Yagubkin doesn't complain about that decision. Yagubkin only says he was not at his best. After his two stand-offs versus American Michael Bentt, as Yagubkin beat Bent badly at the World Cup at Seoul, where Yagubkin was regarded as one of the sport's outstanding defensive stylists, Bentt got himself the poster of Yagubkin on a wall in his room. U.S. Team visited Yagubkin in the USSR in 1984.

As the American professional boxing promoters negotiated with the Soviet Boxing Federation for sending to the U.S. for competing professionally there, they specifically requested for Yagubkin, Miroshnichenko, and Yakovlev. Bob Arum negotiated with the Soviet Ministry of Sport, he wanted them to turn pro on the second Leonard vs. Hearns card. In the words of the Los Angeles Times sportswriter Earl Gustkey, "Yagubkin does have great movement, however, and is a brilliant defensive boxer. He's an accurate puncher, though not a banger. After Adams (Ken Adams, 1988 U.S. Olympic Coach) brings him up to speed on the pro game, it's not hard to imagine Yagubkin running U.S. pro heavyweights ragged and piling up a lot of early wins on decisions. In fact, all three Soviet heavyweights would figure to be in significantly better physical condition than many of the fat U.S. heavyweights on the scene."

But that never happen as the Soviet government dismissed the idea early in 1989, and did not allow the three boxers neither to turn pro, nor to be employed as a sparring partners for the professionals.

Highlights

 Friendship Tournament, Yambol, Bulgaria, July 1979:
Finals: Lost to Peter Philipp (East Germany) by decision
Feliks Stamm Memorial, Warsaw, Poland, November 1979:
1/8: Defeated Leszek Rybiński (Poland) RET 2
1/4: Lost to Anders Eklund (Sweden) by split decision, 2–3
 Junior World Championships, Yokohama, Japan, December 1979:
1/4: Defeated Kazuhiro Sawada (Japan) RSC 1
1/2: Lost to Marvis Frazier (United States) by unanimous decision, 0–5
USSR–USA Duals, Moscow, Soviet Union, January 1980:
Defeated David Bey (United States) by unanimous decision, 3–0
 Belgrade Open, Belgrade, Yugoslavia, February 1980:
Finals: Lost to Aziz Salihu (Yugoslavia) by majority decision, 1–4
USA–USSR Duals, Showboat Hotel, Las Vegas, Nevada, January 1981:
Defeated Tyrell Biggs (United States) by decision
USA–USSR Duals, Hirsch Coliseum, Shreveport, Louisiana, February 1981:
Defeated Freddie Guzman (United States) KO 2 
 European Championships, Tampere, Finland, May 1981:
1/4: Defeated Grzegorz Skrzecz (Poland) by unanimous decision, 5–0
1/2: Defeated Ion Cernat (Romania) by unanimous decision, 5–0
Finals: Defeated Jürgen Fanghänel (East Germany) by unanimous decision, 5–0
 World Cup, Montreal, Canada, November 1981:
1/4: Defeated Willie DeWitt (Canada) by split decision, 3–2
1/2: Defeated Luis Castillo (Ecuador) by decision
Finals: Lost to Carl Williams (United States) by unanimous decision, 0–5
USSR–USA Duals, Lenin Sports Palace, Moscow, Soviet Union, January 1982:
Defeated Mark Mahone (United States) by decision
 World Championships, Munich, West Germany, May 1982:
1/8: Defeated Olaf Mayer (Austria) by unanimous decision, 5–0
1/4: Defeated Dževdet Peci (Yugoslavia) by unanimous decision, 5–0
1/2: Defeated Grzegorz Skrzecz (Poland) by unanimous decision, 5–0
Finals: Defeated Jürgen Fanghänel (East Germany) by unanimous decision, 5–0
 Belgrade Open, Belgrade, Yugoslavia, November 1982:
Finals: Defeated Milenko Andrić (Yugoslavia) by decision
USA–USSR Duals, Caesars Palace, Las Vegas, Nevada, February 1983:
Defeated Warren Thompson (United States) by decision
USA–USSR Duals, Indiana Convention Center, Indianapolis, Indiana, March 1983:
 Defeated Henry Tillman (United States) by decision

AIBA International Challenge, Reno, Nevada, May 1983:
Lost to Willie DeWitt (Canada) by split decision, 2–3
 European Championships, Varna, Bulgaria, May 1983:
1/4: Defeated Arnold van der Lijnde (Netherlands) by unanimous decision, 5–0
1/2: Defeated Paul Golumbeanu (Romania) by unanimous decision, 5–0
Finals: Defeated Gyula Alvics (Hungary) by unanimous decision, 5–0
 World Cup, Rome, Italy, October 1983:
1/4: Defeated Michael Kenny (New Zealand) by unanimous decision, 5–0
1/2: Defeated Angelo Musone (Italy) by majority decision, 4–1
Finals: Defeated Luis Castillo (Ecuador) by unanimous decision, 5–0
 King's Cup, Bangkok, Thailand, April 1984:
1/4: Defeated Mikael Ölund (Sweden) by decision
1/2: Defeated Habibullah Khan (Pakistan) RSC 3
Finals: Defeated Avery Rawls (United States) by decision
 Friendship Games, Estadio Latinoamericano, Havana, Cuba, August 1984:
1/2: Lost to Hermenegildo Báez (Cuba) by split decision, 2–3
USA–USSR Duals, Sparks Convention Center, Reno, Nevada, January 1985:
Defeated James Pritchard (United States) by unanimous decision, 3–0
 European Championships, Budapest, Hungary, May–June 1985:
1/4: Defeated Søren Thomsen (Denmark) by unanimous decision, 5–0
1/2: Defeated Deyan Kirilov (Bulgaria) by unanimous decision, 5–0
Finals: Defeated Gyula Alvics (Hungary) by unanimous decision, 5–0
 World Cup, Seoul, South Korea, November 1985:
1/4: Defeated Lee Hoo Soo (South Korea) by unanimous decision, 5–0
1/2: Defeated Michael Bentt (United States) by majority decision, 4–1
Finals: Defeated Jimmy Peau (New Zealand) KO 2
USSR–USA Duals, Olimpiysky Sport Complex, Moscow, Soviet Union, January 1986:
Defeated Orbit Pough (United States) by unanimous decision, 3–0
 King's Cup, Bangkok, Thailand, April 1986:
Finals: Defeated Mark Saris (Australia) RSC 3
World Championships, Reno, Nevada, May 1986:
1/8: Defeated Domenico D'Amico (Canada) by majority decision, 4–1
1/4: Lost to Michael Bentt (United States) by split decision, 2–3
 European Championships, Turin, Italy, June 1987:
1/4: Defeated Istvan Levai (Hungary) by split decision, 3–2
1/2: Defeated Petar Stoimenov (Bulgaria) RSCI 3
Finals: Lost to Ulli Kaden (East Germany) by split decision, 2–3

Retirement and later life
Despite being one of the world's top heavyweights, Yagubkin, who staunchly represented an essentially provincial sports club on the outskirts, turning down all offers to join highly regarded sports societies, for that and some other purely political reasons never made it to the Soviet Olympic boxing squad on three occasions, in 1980: on the pretext that he was way too young and inexperienced he was replaced with Pyotr Zayev (who won the silver), in 1984: he qualified successfully, but the Soviet government boycotted the Olympics, in 1988: on the pretext that he was too old he was replaced with Ramzan Sebiyev (who was dropped out in the preliminaries). He retired shortly afterwards. He won 9 out of 11 fights versus American boxers during the USA–USSR match-ups.

Honours and awards
He was honoured as a Master of Sports of the USSR.
In 1989 Yagubkin was made an honorary citizen of Ecuador for match-up with his former opponent Luis Castillo.

Death
Yagubkin died of heart failure after repeated cardiac arrest (previous heart seizure roughly a month before his death was relatively mild and went unnoticed, he didn't pay much attention) on 7 August 2013 in Donetsk, Ukraine.

References

1961 births
2013 deaths
Sportspeople from Donetsk
Soviet male boxers
Southpaw boxers
Heavyweight boxers
Super-heavyweight boxers
Honoured Masters of Sport of the USSR
Ukrainian male boxers
AIBA World Boxing Championships medalists